Varberg Fortress is a former fortification in Varberg, Halland County, Sweden, which currently serves as a museum.

History
Varberg Fortress was built in 1287-1300 by Count Jacob Nielsen as protection against Eric VI of Denmark, who had declared him an outlaw after the murder of his father King Eric V of Denmark. Jacob had close connections with King Eric II of Norway and as a result got substantial Norwegian assistance with the construction. The fortress, as well as half the county, became Norwegian in 1305. In the fourteenth century the fortress was expanded to include a castle.

King Erik's grand daughter, Ingeborg Håkansdotter, inherited the area from her father, King Haakon V of Norway. She and her husband, Erik, Duke of Södermanland, established a semi-independent state out of their Norwegian, Swedish and Danish counties until the death of Erik. They spent considerable time at the fortress. Their son, King Magnus IV of Sweden (Magnus VII of Norway), spent much time at the fortress as well.

Varberg was besieged multiple times in the 16th century. Much of the original structure was destroyed as a result. The fortress was augmented during the late 16th and early 17th century on order by King Christian IV of Denmark. However, after the Treaty of Brömsebro in 1645 the fortress became Swedish. It was used as a military installation until 1830 and as a prison from the end of the 17th Century until 1931.

It is currently used as a museum and has a couple of notable pieces on permanent exhibit: Bocksten Man with the only complete clothing from the 1300s known to have been worn by a single individual, and the button that supposedly killed Charles XII of Sweden. The fort also houses a bed and breakfast as well as private accommodation. The moat of the fortress is said to be inhabited by a small lake monster. In August 2006, a couple of witnesses claimed to have seen the monster emerge from the dark water and devour a duck. The creature is described as brown, furless and with a 40 cm long tail.

References

Other sources
Demitz, Jacob Truedson (1996)  Throne of a Thousand Years (Los Angeles: Ristesson Ent)

External links

Varberg County Museum
Varberg history
Varbergs fästnings historia

Buildings and structures in Varberg
Castles in Halland County
Forts in Sweden
Listed buildings in Sweden
Water monsters